Commodore Cruise Line was a United States -based cruise line that was in operation from 1968 until 2001. It was founded in 1966 by Sanford Chobol and Edwin Stephan. Following multiple changes in ownership, the company declared bankruptcy in 2001 due to rising fuel costs and increased competition from other cruise lines. It had its headquarters in Hollywood, Florida.

History

1966–1981
Commodore Cruise Line was founded in 1966—the same year that Norwegian Caribbean Line begun operations—by Sanford Chobol and Edwin Stephan. Chobol, a Florida hotelier, had previously operated the Brazilian ocean liner Princess Leopoldina on a series of cruises out of Florida in 1962. In order to operate a ship that could successfully compete against NCL's , Commodore reached an agreement with the Sweden-based Wallenius Lines, who acquired the build contract of a half-complete ferry under construction at Wärtsilä Turku Shipyard in Finland. The ship in question had been ordered by the Sweden-based Lion Ferry as a combined ferry/cruise ship, but Lion Ferry had subsequently cancelled the order. Wallenius Lines named the incomplete ship  and had her completed as cruise ship. Following delivery the Bohème was chartered to Commodore, and she set on her first cruise from Miami to Saint Thomas on 7 December 1968. With the Bohème Commodore Cruise Line became the first company to operate week-long cruises out of Florida around the year.

By 1973 Lion Ferry and Fred. Olsen had acquired interests in Commodore. As a result, Lion Ferry's  joined the Bohème in Commodore fleet for the northern hemisphere winter seasons 1973–1976 (the Bolero spent summers in United States—Canada ferry service for Lion Ferry). In 1976 the Bolero was replaced by another ferry, that was also used by Commodore during the winters and USA—Canada ferry service during the summers. Like the Bohème, the Caribe was registered in West Germany during her service with Commodore.

1981–1995
In 1981 Commodore Cruise Line was acquired by the Finland-based Rederi Ab Sally, who also acquired the Bohème from Wallenius Lines. As a result of the change of ownership the Bohème was re-registered to Panama. During the same year Sally acquired two ships for conversion into service with Commodore. The first, Karageorgis Lines' , had recently been damaged in a grounding. However, during rebuilding she suffered a fire, followed by capsizing of the drydock, which left the ship so badly damaged that Sally decided to abandon their plans for the ship. Following the Caribe Is entry into service the Bohème was also rebuilt, re-entering service in 1984. However, in 1986 the Bohème was sold to the Church of Scientology, and Commodore reverted to operating just one ship.

By the mid-80s Rederi Ab Sally was in financial difficulties, and in 1987 the company was sold to its main competitors Effoa and Johnson Line, based in Finland and Sweden, respectively. Two years later the passenger operations of Sally, Effoa and Johnson were merged into EffJohn. In 1990 EffJohn decided to merge the operations of Bermuda Star and Queen of Bermuda to the Commodore fleet under the names Enchanted Isle and Enchanted Seas respectively. Promotional material from 1991 advertised the addition of two further ships in 1992/1993, but these did not materialize. Instead the Caribe I was sold to Regal Cruise Line in 1993. In 1994 the Enchanted Isle became a floating hotel in Saint Petersburg, Russia, returning to the Commodore fleet the following year.

1995–2001
By the mid-90s EffJohn in turn was in financial difficulties, and decided to concentrate on its core market in the Baltic Sea. As a result, Commodore Cruise Line was sold in 1995 to the New York -based JeMJ Financial Services. The new owners continued operations with the Enchanted Isle and Enchanted Seas until 1996, when the Enchanted Seas was sold to World Explorer Lines. In 1998 MS Island Holiday was chartered from a Ukrainian company and renamed . Both the Enchanted Capri and Enchanted Isle were based in New Orleans at the time.

In 1999 Commodore reactivated the Crown Cruise Line brand (which had also been previously owned by EffJohn but ceased operations in 1997) as a more upscale brand. During the following years Commodore was facing harsh competition from larger cruise lines that were beginning to push down their prices. As a result, Commodore filed for bankruptcy in January 2001.

Ships

References

External links
 Commodore Cruise Line (Archive)

Defunct cruise lines
Defunct shipping companies of the United States
Defunct companies based in Florida
Hollywood, Florida
American companies established in 1966
Transport companies established in 1966
Transport companies disestablished in 2001
1966 establishments in Florida
2001 disestablishments in Florida